Samuel Nkemena,  OBE was an Anglican bishop in the 20th century.

Nkemena was  educated at St Paul's College, Awka and ordained in 1931. He was a parish priest from then until his appointment as Archdeacon of Aba in 1949. In 1955 he became Archdeacon of  Owerri; and also that year an Assistant Bishop to the Bishop on the Niger. He retired in 1961.

References

Officers of the Order of the British Empire
20th-century Anglican bishops in Nigeria
Archdeacons of Aba
Archdeacons of Owerri
Paul University alumni
Anglican bishops on the Niger
Church of Nigeria archdeacons